JAMA Otolaryngology—Head & Neck Surgery is a monthly peer-reviewed medical journal published by the American Medical Association and covering all aspects of prevention, diagnosis, and treatment of diseases of the head, neck, ear, nose, and throat. The editor-in-chief is Jay F. Piccirillo (Washington University School of Medicine). It was established in 1925 as the Archives of Otolaryngology and renamed A.M.A. Archives of Otolaryngology in 1950, then renamed Archives of Otolaryngology–Head & Neck Surgery in 1960, before obtaining its current name in 2013.

According to the Journal Citation Reports, the journal has a 2021 impact factor of 8.961, ranking it 1st out of 43 titles in the category "Otorhinolaryngology".

Naming history
The journal has undergone several name changes in its history:
JAMA Otorhinolaryngology—Head & Neck Surgery (2013-present)
Archives of Otorhinolaryngology—Head & Neck Surgery (1986-2012)
Archives of Otolaryngology (1960-1986)
A.M.A. Archives of Otolaryngology (1950-1960)
Archives of Otolaryngology (1925-1950)

Abstracting and indexing
The journal is abstracted and indexed in Index Medicus/MEDLINE/PubMed.

See also
List of American Medical Association journals

References

External links

Surgery journals
Otorhinolaryngology journals
American Medical Association academic journals
Monthly journals
English-language journals
Publications established in 1925